Physalaemus riograndensis is a species of frog in the family Leptodactylidae.
It is found in Argentina, Brazil, Paraguay, and Uruguay.
Its natural habitats are subtropical or tropical seasonally wet or flooded lowland grassland, freshwater marshes, intermittent freshwater marshes, arable land, pastureland, ponds, seasonally flooded agricultural land, and canals and ditches.

References

riograndensis
Taxonomy articles created by Polbot
Amphibians described in 1960